Farah Nisa Stockman (born May 21, 1974) is an American journalist who has worked for The Boston Globe and is currently employed by The New York Times. In 2016, she was awarded the Pulitzer Prize for Commentary.

Education

Stockman attended Radcliffe College, graduating in 1996.
She was an active member of the Radcliffe Rugby Football Club.
In the summer of 1996, Stockman directed the Mission Hill Summer Program with Harvard's Phillips Brooks House Association.

Kenya, 1997–2000

Following graduation Stockman served as a school teacher in Kenya for two years.  Stockman and other teachers set up the Jitegemee non-governmental organization.
While living in Kenya, Stockman began writing for The New York Times, The Christian Science Monitor, the Voice of America and Reuters.
During her time in Kenya, Stockman covered the international criminal trials stemming from the Rwandan genocide.

Attempts to interview Mubarik Shah Gillani

Stockman is reported to have been seeking to interview Mubarik Shah Gillani, an individual who was in hiding, who was also being sought by Daniel Pearl at the time of his death.
Mariane Pearl, Daniel Pearl's wife, wrote that an article Stockman wrote, linking Gillani to Richard Reid, was the inspiration for her husband to seek the interview that led to his capture and death.

The Boston Globe

Upon her return to the United States, Stockman started working for The Boston Globe.
She worked in the Globes Washington bureau before becoming a member of the paper's editorial board and an editorial columnist. In 2016, she moved to The New York Times.

Other writing
In 2021, Stockman published American Made based on her prior reporting for The New York Times about the Rexnord factory closure.

Awards

Stockman was a winner of an award from the J. W. Saxe Memorial Fund in the 1990s.
Stockman won her award for her work "with homeless children in Machakos, Kenya". Stockman subsequently became one of the fund's directors.

In 2009, Stockman won the William Brewster Styles Award. 
The award was given by the Scripps Howard Foundation and accompanied by $10,000.
Stockman's award was "for identifying U.S. corporations that were covertly using international relationships and offshore operations to avoid taxes, side-step U.S. laws and deny workers’ rights."

In 2014, at the annual meeting of the Association of Opinion Journalists in Mobile, Stockman received The Eugene C. Pulliam Fellowship for Editorial Writing, presented by the Sigma Delta Chi Foundation, the educational arm of the Society of Professional Journalists. It awards $75,000 each year to an outstanding editorial writer or columnist to help broaden his or her journalistic horizons and knowledge of the world. Stockman was writing a study of race relations, especially in Boston, riven by the 1974 court order to bus students to address de facto segregation in the schools.

In 2016, Stockman was awarded the Pulitzer Prize for Commentary, in recognition of a series of articles examining the effects of busing on Boston schools.

References

External links
 Twitter account

American women journalists
1974 births
Living people
Pulitzer Prize for Commentary winners
The Boston Globe people
21st-century American journalists
Radcliffe College alumni
21st-century American women writers
The New York Times editorial board
People from East Lansing, Michigan
Journalists from Michigan
20th-century American journalists
20th-century American women writers